A sample ballot is a document sent to registered voters to help them prepare for an election. A sample ballot usually provides the voter's polling place and hours, and contains an image of what the actual ballot looks like, including candidates, questions, and instructions for voting.

References

External links
Sample Ballot Lookup Tool by Ballotpedia

Elections terminology